Babcock is a surname.

Babcock may also refer to:

Places
 Babcock (crater), a lunar crater
 Babcock, Georgia
 Babcock, Indiana
 Babcock, Michigan
 Babcock, Wisconsin
 Babcock Lake (disambiguation)
 Babcock State Park, West Virginia

Science
 Babcock Model, a mechanism to describe sunspot patterns
 Babcock test, which determines the fat content of milk

Corporations
 Babcock & Brown, an Australian investment bank
 Babcock & Wilcox, an American company producing energy production and pollution control equipment 
 Babcock International, a British engineering and services company
 Babcock Electric Carriage Company, early 20th century US automobile maker
 Deutsche Babcock, a German engineering and manufacturing company
 Babcock Borsig Service, a German engineering and services company
 Deutsche Babcock Middle East, a German engineering and services holding company in UAE
 Debaj - Deutsche Babcock Al Jaber, a German engineering and services joint-venture company in Qatar
 Doosan Babcock, a British energy services company

Schools
 Babcock University, Seventh-Day Adventist university in Nigeria
 Babcock Graduate School of Management, Wake Forest University's business school, located in Winston-Salem, North Carolina

Other
 Babcock (crater), a lunar crater
 Babcock Amendment, U.S. state of Minnesota constitutional amendment
 USS W. F. Babcock (ID-1239), a collier in commission in the United States Navy from 1917 to 1919

See also
 Babcock House (disambiguation)